We're All Errand Boys (Swedish: Springpojkar är vi allihopa!) is a 1941 Swedish comedy film directed by Ivar Johansson and starring Åke Söderblom, Rune Halvarsson and Gunnar Höglund. It was shot at the Råsunda Studios in Stockholm. The film's sets were designed by the art director Arne Åkermark. Location shooting took place in Stockholm.

Synopsis
Two firms engages in a cutthroat rivalry to gain a new contract.

Cast
 Åke Söderblom as 	Gugge
 Rune Halvarsson as 	Nuffe
 Bert Sorbon as 	Putte
 Gunnar Höglund as Osse
 Lennart Nyberg as 	Harra
 Åke Johansson as 	Nisse
 Esten Areschoug as 	Svampen
 Lill-Acke Jacobsson as 	Jerka
 Karl-Gustaf Jonsson as 	Knutte
 Arne Söderberg as 	Jutte
 Arne Andersson as 	Hempe
 Thor Modéen as 	Grossh. Andersson
 Benkt-Åke Benktsson as Grossh. Nordin 
 Eva Henning as Annie Nordin
 Eric Abrahamsson as Dir. Johansson 
 Viran Rydkvist as 	Bondgumman 
 Anna-Lisa Baude as Frök. Göransson
 Siri Olson as 	Lillan 
 Karl Kinch as Jäderlund

References

Bibliography 
 Qvist, Per Olov & von Bagh, Peter. Guide to the Cinema of Sweden and Finland. Greenwood Publishing Group, 2000.

External links 
 

1941 films
Swedish comedy films
1941 comedy films
1940s Swedish-language films
Films directed by Ivar Johansson
Swedish black-and-white films
Films set in Stockholm
Films shot in Stockholm
1940s Swedish films